Rupite is a village which includes a small mountainous protected area in the southeastern part of Blagoevgrad Province, Bulgaria, 10-12 kilometres northeast of Petrich, inside Petrich Municipality, on the right bank of the Struma River. It is best known as the place where the Bulgarian medium Baba Vanga lived and was buried. The area is in fact the crater of an extinct volcano, its appearance being shaped by the volcanic hill of Kozhuh, the thermal springs and Pchelina Hill. The village has 1,124 inhabitants.
Rupite is a protected area, which is situated at a distance of about 10 km from Petrich and 2 km from the village of Rupite, at the eastern foot of the extinct volcano Kozhuh Mountain (281 meters altitude). The hill was built by volcanic rocks. Its name comes from the fact that it looks like a mantle (kozhuh in Bulgarian). In 1962 a part of the locality of Kozhuh – 0.4 hectares – was declared a natural landmark. 
The protected area of Rupite is famous for its healing mineral springs with a temperature of 74° C and capacity of up to 35 L/sec. The climate in the locality is transitional-Mediterranean, which is a reason for the presence of Mediterranean grass vegetation and some thermoliphic animal species. The natural by-river forest consists mainly of White Poplar (Populus Alba).
The protected areas of Rupite and Kozhuh Mountain are homes to various snake species. Here you can see the relatively rare species – Cat Snake (Telescopus fallax). There are 201 bird species in the Rupite area, including various Mediterranean species, which can rarely be seen in other places in our country. Via Aristotelis passes through this area. This is one of the two basic bird migration routes through the territory of the country. In the region visitors can see species, such as the Large Olive Warbler (Нippolais Olivetorum), White-headed Shrike (Lanius nubicus) and Black-headed Shrike (Lanius minor). During the migration and the wintering period here stays the globally endangered species Small Cormorant (Phalacrocorax pygmaeus).
The remains of an ancient town, existing within the period from 4th century BC to the 6th century AD are located along the south slopes and at the foot of the volcanic hill Kozhuh. According to explorers, this was the main town of the Thracian tribe Sints – Heraclea Sintica.
The memorial temple “St. Petka of Bulgaria”, built in 1994 is situated in the locality of Rupite. The locality is mostly famous as a place related to the prophet Vanga, and by this it attracts thousands of worshippers and tourists. Vangeliya Gushterova (1911 – 1996), is the full name of the prophet, was famous around the whole world with her multiple prophecies which had come true. According to a legend, Vanga lost her sight in her early childhood years in a storm, but during the accident she had a vision, which gave her the unique abilities. In the last years of her life, Vanga lived in a small house in the Rupite, because according to her relatives she considered the area an energy source and collected her powers from it. The church was built by monetary means, provided by Vanga, and it is notable for its wall paintings. They were made by the famous Bulgarian artist Svetlin Rusev and they are quite realistic, which differentiates them from the Orthodox canon. Despite the fact that the temple was not built according to the rules of the Orthodox church, it attracts thousands of worshippers and tourists because of its connection with Grandmother Vanga.

Nature

The landscape of Rupite is dominated by the eminence of Kozhuh (Кожух, "fur coat", taking its name from its shape resembling a fur coat thrown on) situated to the west. Although it is only 281 m high, it rises like a high mountain from the low and flat Petrich Plain. The eminence, which is part of the outskirts of the extinct volcano, consists of three small summits, of which the middle one is the highest. Volcanic rocks and rock pyramids can be observed at the foot of Kozhuh. Due to the eminence's interesting origin (often called "the only volcano in Bulgaria") and the abundance of rare species of the Bulgarian flora and fauna, Kozhuh is a proclaimed natural landmark since 1962. Remains of an ancient town called Petra,  were discovered at the southwestern foot of Kozhuh. In 2002, the scientists came across the proof of their identification of the city: a Latin inscription, dated 308 AD, of an imperial appeal addressed to the local urban citizens of Heraclea Sintica. Thus ended the years-long argument between Greece and Bulgaria about where Heraclea Sintica actually was.

Apart from the eminence, Rupite is also known for the curative hot springs issuing in the area, with a temperature of 71-78 °C and an average discharge of 35 L/s. The climate in Rupite is very specific, transitional between continental and Mediterranean and featuring hot dry summers and mild winters, which is one of the reasons for the variety of rare plant species, 13 of which are endangered in Bulgaria. 201 bird species inhabit the area, including a number of species typical for the Mediterranean that are not present in other areas of the country. Almost all of the snake species that can be observed in Bulgaria can be found in Rupite, as well as four species of tortoises and other animals that prefer relatively high temperatures.

Population 
The village of Rupite had 926 inhabitants at the end of 2019, up from 626 inhabitants in 1934 but down from 1,248 people in 1985. The population is declining since Fall of Communism. Nearly all inhabitants are ethnic Bulgarians (99.6%).

Church

The Church of St Petka was constructed at a site chosen by Baba Vanga in 1992 and has since then become a place of worship for many people and a renowned tourist attraction. The icons were created by the noted artist Svetlin Rusev and were not generally approved by the Holy Synod of the Bulgarian Orthodox Church for being too realistic and not conforming to the canons. The house of Vanga can be seen nearby and a new monastery is currently under construction.

Honour 
Rupite Glacier on Smith Island, South Shetland Islands is named after Rupite.

See also 
 Heraclea Sintica

References

External links

 Nikola Gruev's gallery of Rupite

Villages in Blagoevgrad Province
Tourist attractions in Blagoevgrad Province
Geology of Bulgaria